This is a list of albums attributed to the anime adaptation of My Bride Is a Mermaid. There have been five soundtrack singles released for the anime which contained the opening, ending, and insert songs featured in the anime series. There are six additional character song albums sung by the voice actors of six of the female characters.

(Note: All these are released under Avex Entertainment, unless otherwise noted.)

Soundtracks

Romantic Summer

Romantic Summer is the opening theme single to the anime Seto no Hanayome. The single was released on April 25, 2007, and is sung by Haruko Momoi and Sakura Nogawa.

Track listing
"Romantic Summer"
 Vocals: Haruko Momoi (SUN) and Sakura Nogawa (LUNAR)
 Lyrics: Haruko Momoi
 Music: Haruko Momoi
 Arrangement: Haruko Momoi

"Romantic Summer instrumental version"

Asu e no Hikari

 is the first ending theme single to the anime Seto no Hanayome. The single was released on May 2, 2007, and is sung by Asuka Hinoi.

Track listing

 Vocals: Asuka Hinoi
 Lyrics: Yugo Sasakura
 Music: Yugo Sasakura
 Arrangement: Yugo Sasakura
"VOICES"

"VOICES (Instrumental)"

Dan Dan Dan

Dan Dan Dan is the second ending theme single to the anime Seto no Hanayome. The single was released on August 22, 2007, and is sung by Haruko Momoi and Sakura Nogawa.

Track listing
"Dan Dan Dan"
 Vocals: Haruko Momoi (SUN) and Sakura Nogawa (LUNAR)
 Lyrics: Gorō Matsui
 Music: Shūhei Naruse
 Arrangement: Shūhei Naruse
"your gravitation -SUN & LUNAR version-"
"Dan Dan Dan instrumental version"
"your gravitation instrumental version"

your gravitation

your gravitation is the single containing an insert used in the anime Seto no Hanayome. The single was released on May 23, 2007, and is sung by Haruko Momoi.

Track listing
"your gravitation"
 Vocals: Haruko Momoi (SUN)
 Lyrics: Funta
 Music: Funta
 Arrangement: Funta
"your gravitation instrumental version"

Lunarian

Lunarian is the single containing an insert used in the anime Seto no Hanayome. The single was released on May 23, 2007, and is sung by Sakura Nogawa.

Track listing
"Lunarian"
 Vocals: Sakura Nogawa (LUNAR)
 Lyrics: Funta
 Music: Funta
 Arrangement: Funta
"Lunarian -instrumental version-"

Zettai Otome

Zettai Otome is the opening theme single to the anime Seto no Hanayome OVA Jin. The single was released on October 29, 2008, and is sung by Haruko Momoi and Sakura Nogawa.

Track listing

 Vocals: Haruko Momoi (SUN) and Sakura Nogawa (LUNAR)

 Vocals: Haruko Momoi (SUN)

 Vocals: Sakura Nogawa (LUNAR)

Mirai e Go

Mirai e Go is the ending theme single to the anime Seto no Hanayome OVA Jin. The single was released on November 28, 2008, and is sung by Rika Morinaga and Eri Kitamura.

Track listing

 Vocals: DEKABANCHO (Rika Morinaga and Eri Kitamura)

 Vocals: Rika Morinaga (DEKA)

 Vocals: Eri Kitamura (BANCHO)

Character songs
The following are single character songs attributed to the anime Seto no Hanayome.

Brand-new mind

Brand-new mind is the single released on June 27, 2007, and is sung by Haruko Momoi, who provided the voice acting for the character Sun Seto in the anime.

Track listing
"Brand-new mind"
 Vocals: Haruko Momoi (Sun Seto)
 Lyrics: Yoriko Mori
 Music: Yoshihiro Kusano
 Arrangement: Yoshihiro Kusano

 Vocals: Haruko Momoi (Sun Seto)
 Lyrics: Gorō Matsui
 Music: Kōji Takanashi
 Arrangement: Kōji Takanashi
"Brand-new mind instrumental version"

Wishing!

Wishing is the single released on June 27, 2007, and is sung by Sakura Nogawa, who provided the voice acting for the character Lunar Edomae in the anime.

Track listing
"Wishing!"
 Vocals: Sakura Nogawa (Lunar Edomae)
 Lyrics: Funta
 Music: Funta
 Arrangement: Funta

 Vocals: Sakura Nogawa (Lunar Edomae)
 Lyrics: Gorō Matsui
 Music: Purin
 Arrangement: Purin
"Wishing! instrumental version"

GAP

GAP is the single released on June 27, 2007, and is sung by Rika Morinaga, who provided the voice acting for the character Mawari Zenigata in the anime.

Track listing
"GAP"
 Vocals: Rika Morinaga (Mawari Zenigata)

 Vocals: Halko Momoi & Sakura Nogawa (Sun Seto & Lunar Edomae)
"GAP instrumental version"

Hitman!!

Hitman!! is the single released on October 3, 2007, and is sung by Natsuko Kuwatani, who provided the voice acting for the character Maki in the anime.

Track listing

 Vocals: Natsuko Kuwatani (Maki)

"Brand-new mind (Re-mix version)"
 Vocals: Halko Momoi (Sun Seto)

 Vocals: Natsuko Kuwatani (Maki)

Who are you?

Who are you? is the single released on October 3, 2007, and is sung by Noriko Rikimaru, who provided the voice acting for the character Iinchou in the anime.

Track listing
"Who are you?"
 Vocals: Noriko Rikimaru (Iinchou)
"Who are you? (Instrumental version)"
"GAP (Re-mix version)"
 Vocals: Rika Morinaga (Mawari Zenigata)
"Who are you? (Re-mix version)"
 Vocals: Noriko Rikimaru (Iinchou)

Rasen

Rasen is the single released on October 3, 2007, and is sung by Eri Kitamura, who provided the voice acting for the character Akeno Shiranui in the anime.

Track listing

 Vocals: Eri Kitamura (Akeno Shiranui)

"Wishing! (Re-mix version)"
 Vocals: Sakura Nogawa (Lunar Edomae)

 Vocals: Eri Kitamura (Akeno Shiranui)

Anime soundtracks
Film and television discographies
Avex Group albums
Discographies of Japanese artists